The Bethlehem Grange No. 137 is a historic Grange hall located in Selkirk, Albany County, New York, United States. It was built in 1921 and expanded in 1936. This rectangular, wood-frame building is three bays wide, four bays long, two stories tall and has a medium-pitched hipped roof.

It was listed on the National Register of Historic Places in 2002.

References

External links
Bethlehem Grange No. 137 website

Grange buildings on the National Register of Historic Places in New York (state)
Buildings and structures completed in 1921
Buildings and structures in Albany County, New York
National Register of Historic Places in Albany County, New York